is a Japanese tokusatsu science fiction television series produced by Tsuburaya Productions. The fourth entry in the Ultra series, the series aired on Tokyo Broadcasting System from April 2, 1971, to March 31, 1972. It became successful enough to inspire a second "Kaiju Boom" in Japan, with rival studios producing their own tokusatsu shows and Tsuburaya Productions producing additional Ultraman shows annually for the next three years. Prior to the series' release, Ultra Q, Ultraman, and Ultraseven were stand-alone titles however, Return of Ultraman is the first installment to unite the first three shows into an interconnected universe.

Premise

This series is a follow-up to the original Ultraman and Ultraseven that is set in 1971, four years after Ultraseven left Earth, and five years after Ultraman came to Earth. The first episode begins with a fight between two giant monsters named Takkong and Zazahn in Tokyo. Amid the monster destruction, young race-car driver Hideki Go is killed while trying to rescue a little boy and a dog from the falling rubble. His valiant sacrifice is noted by everyone, including his friends and the new defense force MAT (Monster Attack Team), but an unseen being also takes notice. Looking over Hideki is "New Ultraman" ("Ultraman Jack"), who is so touched by the race car driver's heroism, that he decides to combine his life force with that of Hideki, thus bringing him back to life (just like the original Ultraman did with Shin Hayata), much to everyone's astonishment. MAT then asks Hideki to join the team, which he does, especially since in this frightening new "Age of Monsters", Earth will need a savior. In times of crisis, Hideki will raise his right arm and, by force of will, transform into Ultraman to fight monsters. In addition, the original Ultraman and Ultra Seven are watching New Ultraman's battles from the sidelines, and offer their help when he is in peril.

Cast
Humans:

Voice performers:

Production
Eiji Tsuburaya had intended Ultraseven to be the conclusion to the Ultra series. However, due to increased merchandise sales from the first three shows and demand by fans for a new show, Tsuburaya decided to develop the fourth Ultra series. Tsuburaya conceived the show's title and the idea was for the show to be a direct sequel to the 1966 series, with Hayata and passing the Beta Capsule over to a new human host. The idea was submitted to Tokyo Broadcasting System (TBS) in April 1969. However, TBS and its sponsors requested that the new series be centered on a brand new Ultraman, separate from the 1966 character, for marketing and merchandise purposes.

After Tsuburaya's death, his eldest son Hajime was named president of Tsuburaya Productions and assembled a team to revise Return of Ultraman. The first three shows were rebroadcast to temporarily appease fan demands. Shozo Uehara and TBS producer Yoji Hashimoto conceived the final concept of the series. Revisions were made to the new Ultraman's design, after feedback from licensees, to avoid similarities with the 1966 Ultraman. This included giving the new Ultraman gloves, boots, and pinstripes around the red areas. The new character was referred to as "New Ultraman" by fans and the name was used by Tsuburaya Productions for later appearances. The character was rebranded as "Ultraman Jack" in 1984 after Tsuburaya Productions held a contest for children to submit suggestions.

Episodes

Post-release

Manga
A manga series by Akira Mizuho ran in Bessatsu Shōnen Sunday from May to December 1971.

Home media
In November 2015, Tsuburaya Productions and Bandai Visual released the series on Blu-ray in Japan. In July 2019, Mill Creek Entertainment announced that it had acquired most of the Ultraman library from Tsuburaya Productions through Indigo Entertainment, including 1,100 TV episodes and 20 films. Mill Creek released the series on Blu-ray and digital in North America on February 25, 2020, in standard and steelbook sets.

In July 2020, Shout! Factory announced to have struck a multi-year deal with Alliance Entertainment and Mill Creek, with the blessings of Tsuburaya and Indigo, that granted them the exclusive SVOD and AVOD digital rights to the Ultra series and films (1,100 TV episodes and 20 films) acquired by Mill Creek the previous year. Return of Ultraman, amongst other titles, will stream in the United States and Canada through Shout! Factory TV and Tokushoutsu.

Notes

References

Sources

External links

Official website of Tsuburaya Productions 
Ultraman Connection — Official website 
Official Ultraman channel at YouTube

Ultra television series
1971 Japanese television series debuts
1972 Japanese television series endings
1971 manga
TBS Television (Japan) original programming